David Tucker is an American poet, and news editor.

Life
He graduated from the University of Michigan, where he studied with Donald Hall.

He is an assistant managing editor of the Metro section of The Star-Ledger of Newark.

He married and had a daughter, Calisa. His second marriage was to Beth Johnson; they have two daughters, Emily, and Amy.

Awards
 2007 Witter Bynner Fellowship
 Bakeless prize from the Bread Loaf Writer’s Conference

Works
 "The Dancer", Poetry Foundation
 "Today’s News", Poetry Foundation

References

Year of birth missing (living people)
Living people
University of Michigan alumni
American male poets